Ankaradan Abim Geldi is a Turkish popular song.

The song
The title literally means " My elder brother has come from Ankara" Although not stated firmly, it is understood that the elder brother is in a school in Ankara and has visited his family during the vacation. This visit caused joy in the family. The setting is in the past (acne, monochrome film etc.) and the lyric reflects his nostalgia.

Recording
The song was composed and lyricized by İlhan Şeşen of the musical group Grup Gündoğarken and arranged by Ozan Doğulu. It was released by Kervan Plakçık recording company in 1992 as an album and cassette titled Ankara'dan Abim Geldi. After its immediate success it was included in a 1993 album and CD with the same title.

References

1992 singles
Turkish popular music
Turkish-language songs
1992 songs